For more information on the use of the term open source in connection with films, see Open source film.

Published films

Upcoming films

References

Open content